The Faithful & District Football Association was an Australian Rules Football competition, based in the Riverina region of New South Wales first established in 1920 at a meeting of club delegates from the following football clubs - Greenvale, Faithful and Sandigo, with a draw arranged too. The League went into recess in April 1940 due to World War Two but never reformed after the war.

History
The Faithful & DFA was located in the Riverina region of New South Wales, 36 kilometres from Narrandera in an area that had and still has a rich farming history, in cropping, cattle and sheep and wool production and located 17 kilometres from Kywong, which is near the Sturt Highway.

Commencing with only three clubs in 1920, it grew to six clubs in the mid-1930s and produced some outstanding footballers from the ten club's that played in the competition during its 20 years in existence.

When the association was formed in 1920 and a fixture was arranged, but there appears to be no published results of any games or final series from 1920.

The Sandigo FC played in nine grand finals in their 11 years in the competition from 1920 to 1930, winning four premierships.

In 1929, Sandigo applied for admission to play in the Wagga-based Second Grade Football Association, but was refused on the grounds that Sandigo could not fill their team with entirely junior players, but would require senior players to make up the team each week

Between 1929 and 1936, Greenvale FC played in eight consecutive grand finals and all up played in 15 grand finals for eight premierships during their 20 years of competing in the Faithful & DFL. In 1923, Greenvale were undefeated premiers.

In 1921, Mr M J Quilter donated a trophy for the most unselfish player in the Faithful & DFA and was won by Harold Scilley from the Sandigo FC.

Sandigo (55) defeated Greenvale (28) in the 1930 grand final. Greenvale protested on the grounds that Sandigo played some ineligible players and Greenvale was ultimately awarded the 1930 premiership.

When Cullivel joined the Association in 1931, their club President was international rugby union player, Aub Hodgson.

In July, 1935, the Faithful & DFL side, 12.14 - 86 defeated the Leeton & DFA side, 8.13 - 61, at Boree Creek.

An inter-league match was played between Faithful & DFL and the South West Football League in Narrandera, in June, 1936, with the SWFL winning by 22 points.

A league best and fairest medal was awarded to Leo Foley from the Greenvale FC in 1936, who also kicked eight goals in their grand final victory.

In July, 1939, the Faithful & DFL hosted a knockout football competition at Boree Creek, with Ganmain FC defeating the Faithful & DFL - A side in the grand final.

At the Association's 1940 AGM the committee and club delegates decided to go into recess due to World War Two, but the association never reformed after the war, with most club's folding and some playing in other nearby association's.

Football Clubs
Boree Creek:(black & white) 1925 - 1928, 1929 in recess, 1930 - 1939. The club went into recess from 1940 to 1944 due to WW2. Joined the Milbrulong Football League in 1945.
Brookdale: 1934. Club folded. 
Cullivel: (black & tan) 1931 - 1933, (1934 in recess), 1935 - 1939. The club went into recess from 1940 to 1945 due to WW2. Merged with Urana FC in 1952 and played in the Coreen & District Football League until 1972.  
Faithful: 1920 - 1924, 1925 - 1929 in recess, 1930 - 1938. Club folded. Faithful was a farming district between Sandigo and Kywong approximately.
Greenvale: (green & gold) 1920 - 1939. Joined the Lockhart & District Football League in 1940 and were runners up to Osborne FC. The club did not reform after WW2.
Kywong: (red & green) 1922 & 1923, 1934 - 1935. Club folded.
Morundah: (red) 1924 - 1939. The club went into recess from 1940 to 1945 due to WW2 and did not reform after WW2.
Narrandera Town: 1929. The Faithful & DFL did not accept them into the competition in 1930. They later joined the Wagga & South West Line Football Association in 1930.
Sandigo: (blue & gold) 1920 - 1930. After a long and protracted protest after the 1930 grand final with the Faithful & DFA, in which Greenvale was awarded the premiership, Sandigo went into recess in 1931 and then joined the Narrandera Football Association in 1932. Club folded after the 1932 football season.
Urana: 1936 & 1937. Went into recess from 1938 to 1945. Merged with Cullivel in 1946 and played in the Coreen & District Football League from 1946 to 1972 as Urana Cullivel FC.

Teams in Association per year
1920 - 3: Faithful, Greenvale, Sandigo.
1921 - 4: Faithful, Greenvale, Kywong, Sandigo. 
1922 - 4: Faithful, Greenvale, Kywong, Sandigo. 
1923 - 3: Faithful, Greenvale, Sandigo.
1924 - 4: Faithful, Greenvale, Morundah, Sandigo.
1925 - 4: Boree Creek, Greenvale, Morundah, Sandigo.
1926 - 4: Boree Creek, Greenvale, Morundah, Sandigo.
1927 - 4: Boree Creek, Greenvale, Morundah, Sandigo.
1928 - 4: Boree Creek, Greenvale, Morundah, Sandigo.
1929 - 4: Greenvale, Morundah, Narrandera, Sandigo.
1930 - 5: Boree Creek, Faithful, Greenvale, Morundah, Sandigo.
1931 - 5: Boree Creek, Cullivel, Faithful, Greenvale, Morundah.
1932 - 5: Boree Creek, Cullivel, Faithful, Greenvale, Morundah.
1933 - 5: Boree Creek, Cullivel, Faithful, Greenvale, Morundah.
1934 - 6: Boree Creek, Brookdale, Faithful, Greenvale, Kywong, Morundah.
1935 - 6: Boree Creek, Cullivel, Faithful, Greenvale, Kywong, Morundah.
1936 - 6: Boree Creek, Cullivel, Faithful, Greenvale, Morundah, Urana.
1937 - 6: Boree Creek, Cullivel, Faithful, Greenvale, Morundah, Urana.
1938 - 5: Boree Creek, Cullivel, Faithful, Greenvale, Morundah.
1939 - 4: Boree Creek, Cullivel, Greenvale, Morundah.

 Years in the Faithful & DFA competition
Greenvale: 20
Morundah: 16
Boree Creek: 14
Faithful: 14
Sandigo: 11
Cullivel: 8
Kywong: 4
Urana: 2
Brookdale: 1
Narrandera: 1

Football Grand Finals

 1930 - Greenvale FC awarded the premiership on protest.

Most Premierships / Runners Up

O'Loan Cup
The O'Loan Cup was an annual representative game of football which commenced in 1927 and was played between the Faithful & DFA and the Narrandera Second Grade Football Association with a handsome cup donated by Mr. P. Frank O'Loan of the Criterion Hotel, Narrandera for the purpose of raising funds for the Narrandera Public Hospital.

Officer Bearers

References

Links
Albury & District Football League 
Central Hume Football Association
Coreen & District Football League
Farrer Football League
Hume Football Netball League
Riverina Football Association

Sport in the Riverina
Sports leagues established in 1924
1924 establishments in Australia
Australian rules football clubs
Defunct Australian rules football competitions in New South Wales
Australian rules football competitions